Charles Talbot (26 October 1769 – 28 February 1823) was an English churchman, Dean of Exeter from 1802, and Dean of Salisbury from 1809.

His parents were the Rev. George Talbot, son of Charles Talbot, 1st Baron Talbot of Hensol, and his wife Anne Bouverie, daughter of Jacob Bouverie, 1st Viscount Folkestone. He became rector of Wimborne in 1794.

Talbot married Elizabeth Somerset, daughter of Henry Somerset, 5th Duke of Beaufort and his wife Elizabeth Boscawen. They had 14 children, including:

Frances Cecil (d. 7 Nov 1855), who married Hon. Philip Henry Abbot, son of Charles Abbot, 1st Baron Colchester. They had a son, and daughter.
Maria Charlotte (d. 26 Aug 1827), who married Henry Every, son of Sir Henry Every, 9th Baronet. However she died a year after their marriage without issue.
Georgiana Elizabeth (d. 23 June 1885), who married Rev. Augustus Philip Clayton, son of Sir William Clayton, 4th Baronet. They had a son, and daughter.
Rev. Henry George (28 June 1798 – 10 March 1867), who married Mary Elizabeth Ponsonby, daughter of Maj.-Gen. Sir William Ponsonby.
Rear-Adm. Charles (1 Nov 1801-8 Aug 1876), who also married a daughter of Maj.-Gen. Ponsonby, the Hon. Charlotte Georgiana Ponsonby. They had seven children.
Col. George (19 Aug 1809-2 Feb 1871), who married Frances West, daughter of Lt.-Col. F. Ralph West of the 33rd Regiment. They had a son, Maj.-Gen. FitzRoy Somerset Talbot.

Notes

1769 births
1823 deaths
19th-century English Anglican priests
Deans of Exeter
Deans of Salisbury